Psyllos ("flea"), is an uninhabited Greek islet, in the Aegean Sea, close to the northern coast of eastern Crete. Administratively it lies within the Ierapetra municipality of Lasithi.

See also
List of islands of Greece

References

Landforms of Lasithi
Uninhabited islands of Crete
Islands of Greece